Oprandi is a surname. Notable people with the surname include:

 Romina Oprandi (born 1986), Swiss-Italian tennis player
 , French ice hockey player